Fong Seow Hor (8 January 19379 March 2022) was a Malaysian former swimmer. He competed at the 1956 Summer Olympics and the 1960 Summer Olympics. He died on 9 March 2022 in Kuala Lumpur, at the age of 85.

References

External links
 

1937 births
2022 deaths
Malaysian male swimmers
Olympic swimmers of Malaya
Swimmers at the 1956 Summer Olympics
Swimmers at the 1960 Summer Olympics
People from Penang